Alaska Milk Corporation (AMC) is a manufacturer of milk products in the Philippines. It is a subsidiary of Dutch dairy cooperative FrieslandCampina, which acquired control (98.1%) of the company from the founding Uytengsu family in 2012.

The company has no connection to the US state of Alaska.

History

In 1972, Holland Milk Products, Inc. (HOMPI) was established. It was a joint venture between General Milling Corporation (GMC) and Holland Canned Milk International B.V. (now FrieslandCampina). HOMPI initially manufactured canned liquid milk (evaporated milk and condensed milk). It eventually expanded to manufacture powdered milk and UHT milk.

In 1994, HOMPI was spun off from GMC and incorporated as Alaska Milk Corporation (AMC) under the control Wilfred Uytengsu Sr. Shortly after its incorporation, AMC was listed in the Philippine Stock Exchange (PSE) in 1995.

Wilfred Steven Uytengsu Jr., eldest son of Wilfred Sr., assumed the position of president and CEO in 2007. The elder Uytengsu died in April 2010 at the age of 82.

In 2007, AMC acquired the canned milk business of Nestlé Philippines, Inc. The acquisition included the Alpine, Liberty, and Krem Top trademarks, as well as the trademark licenses (until 2021) for Nestle's Carnation and Milkmaid brands.

In 2012, FrieslandCampina acquired majority control of AMC from the Uytengsu family. On November 5, 2012, AMC was delisted from the PSE after FrieslandCampina completed its tender offering for 98.1% ownership of AMC. Prior to this, FrieslandCampina held an 8.1% interest in AMC. Wilfred Steven Uytengsu Jr. remained as president and CEO until the end of 2018. Since 2019, Uytengsu serves as the Chairman of the company.

Brands 
Current
 Alaska
 Alpine 
 Cow Bell
 Friso
 Krem-Top
 Liberty
Former
 Carnation (2007–2021)
 Milkmaid (2007–2021)

Sports

Alaska Aces
The company owned the Philippine Basketball Association (PBA) team, the Alaska Aces, which it established in 1986. On February 16, 2022, AMC announced that the team will leave the PBA at the end of the 2021 Governors' Cup due to a directive by its parent company, FrieslandCampina. Alaska ended their final PBA tournament with a loss to the NLEX Road Warriors in the quarterfinals. Immediately following their final game on March 19, 2022, a brief ceremony was held to mark the Alaska's departure from the PBA. On March 23, 2022, the PBA announced the sale of the Aces to Converge ICT.

Other sports sponsorships
Alaska Tri-Aspire Philippines (triathlon team)
Alaska Power Camp (basketball and football development camps)
Alaska Ironkids Philippines (triathlon series)
Alaska Football Cup (football tournament)
Jr. NBA/Jr. WNBA Philippines (presenting partner)

References

External links
 
 Friso Milk Philippines

Companies listed on the Philippine Stock Exchange
FrieslandCampina subsidiaries
Dairy products companies of the Philippines
Drink companies of the Philippines
Food and drink companies established in 1972
Companies based in Makati
Philippine companies established in 1972
Philippine brands
Philippine subsidiaries of foreign companies
2012 mergers and acquisitions